Synthetic diamonds are produced via high pressure, high temperature (HPHT) or chemical vapor deposition (CVD) technology. These diamonds have numerous industrial and commercial uses including cutting tools, thermal conductors and consumer diamond gemstones.

Gemstone diamond producers

 Apollo Diamond (defunct, assets sold in 2011 to Scio Diamond)
 ALTR Created Diamonds
 De Beers (Lightbox) 
 Diamond Foundry
 Gemesis (now a non-producing reseller called Pure Grown Diamonds)
 Scio Diamond Technology Corporation (colorless)
 Tairus
 WD Lab Grown Diamonds

Industrial diamonds

Element Six
Morgan Technical Ceramics (as "Diamonex")
 Scio Diamond Technology Corporation
 Sumitomo Electric Industries

References